Petina may refer to:

 Petina, Campania, Italian municipality of the Province of Salerno, Campania
 Petina (Kruševac), Serbian village of Kruševac municipality, in Rasina District
 Petina, Croatia, a village in the Velika Gorica municipality, Zagreb County

See also
 Patina